Jiang Yanjiao (born 26 June 1986), is a Chinese badminton player from Changzhou. She graduated from the Huaqiao University.

Career
A winner of both the BWF World Junior Championships (2002) and the Asian Junior Championships (2004), Jiang has since emerged as one of the world's leading women's singles players. She won the Chinese national title in 2005, the Denmark Open in 2006, the Asian Championships in both 2007 and 2008, and the China Open in 2008. Jiang played singles for China's world champion Uber Cup (women's international) teams of 2006 and 2008.

As one of several Chinese women's singles players who rate among the world's best, Jiang has been excluded from some international competitions which set a maximum number of participants from any one country. For example, at the 2008 Olympic Games in Beijing neither Jiang nor reigning world champion Zhu Lin were entered in the women's singles event which limited the strongest badminton nations to three competitors.

Achievements

World Cup 
Women's singles

Asian Championships 
Women's singles

World Junior Championships 
Girls' singles

Asian Junior Championships 
Girls' singles

BWF Superseries 
The BWF Superseries has two level such as Superseries and Superseries Premier. A season of Superseries features twelve tournaments around the world, which introduced since 2011, with successful players invited to the Superseries Finals held at the year end.

Women's Singles

 BWF Superseries Finals tournament
 BWF Superseries Premier tournament
 BWF Superseries tournament

BWF Grand Prix 
The BWF Grand Prix has two level such as Grand Prix and Grand Prix Gold. It is a series of badminton tournaments, sanctioned by Badminton World Federation (BWF) since 2007. The World Badminton Grand Prix sanctioned by International Badminton Federation (IBF) since 1983.

Women's singles

 BWF Grand Prix Gold tournament
 BWF & IBF Grand Prix tournament

Record against selected opponents 
Record against Year-end Finals finalists, World Championships semi-finalists, and Olympic quarter-finalists.

References

External links 
 

1986 births
Living people
Sportspeople from Changzhou
Badminton players from Jiangsu
Chinese female badminton players
Badminton players at the 2010 Asian Games
Asian Games gold medalists for China
Asian Games medalists in badminton
Medalists at the 2010 Asian Games
21st-century Chinese women
20th-century Chinese women